Robbins is a village southwest of Chicago in Cook County, Illinois, United States. The population was 4,629 at the 2020 census. Darren E. Bryant is the current mayor of Robbins. It is the second oldest Black incorporated town in the north following Brooklyn, Illinois and was home to the country’s first black-owned airport.

History
Robbins was incorporated on December 14, 1917 and named for Eugene S. Robbins, a real estate developer who laid out the village's early subdivisions.  The village's founder and first mayor was Thomas J. Kellar, who noted in an early interview "Our people in Robbins are mostly people who got tired of the white fights and the crowded city. They come out here to raise chickens, make gardens, and be a little more free". Robbins was the only municipality in the north that was entirely governed by African-Americans. Kellar, who was a clerk for the Cook County Board of Assessors, was tasked with investigating the procedures of incorporation. Thomas J. Kellar School in Robbins was named in his honor and first opened for the 1954 school year.

After incorporation the community became a popular recreation spot for black Chicagoans, who crowded its picnic grounds and nightclubs on summer weekends.

Geography

Demographics
As of the 2020 census there were 4,629 people, 1,551 households, and 951 families residing in the village. The racial makeup of the village was 84.77% African American, 5.92% White, 0.32% Native American, 0.22% Asian, 0.02% Pacific Islander, 5.21% from other races, and 3.54% from two or more races. Hispanic or Latino of any race were 7.47% of the population.

There were 1,551 households, out of which 43.52% had children under the age of 18 living with them, 26.05% were married couples living together, 29.08% had a female householder with no husband present, and 38.68% were non-families. 34.82% of all households were made up of individuals, and 17.60% had someone living alone who was 65 years of age or older. The average household size was 3.96 and the average family size was 2.97.

The village's age distribution consisted of 20.9% under the age of 18, 11.0% from 18 to 24, 27.1% from 25 to 44, 25% from 45 to 64, and 15.9% who were 65 years of age or older. The median age was 35.0 years. For every 100 females, there were 79.1 males. For every 100 females age 18 and over, there were 80.9 males.

The median income for a household in the village was $35,815, and the median income for a family was $59,538. Males had a median income of $27,092 versus $26,667 for females. The per capita income for the village was $16,108. About 20.3% of families and 33.8% of the population were below the poverty line, including 36.9% of those under age 18 and 21.4% of those age 65 or over.

Note: the US Census treats Hispanic/Latino as an ethnic category. This table excludes Latinos from the racial categories and assigns them to a separate category. Hispanics/Latinos can be of any race.

Government
Robbins is in Illinois's 1st congressional district.

In April 2021, Darren E. Bryant was elected mayor of Robbins. At age 29, he is the youngest African-American mayor ever elected in Illinois.

Transportation
Robbins is served by a station on Metra's Rock Island District commuter rail line. Robbins is served by two Pace bus routes, 359 Robbins/South Kedzie Avenue and 385 87th/111th/127th.

Interstate 294 runs through Robbins, but it has no exits within the village limits. Access to Interstates 57 and 294 are within a five- to eight-minute drive.

Midway International Airport is within 25-30 minute drive. The village is home to MDW's southern approach radar tower. O'Hare International Airport is within a 30-45 minute drive via Interstate 294 using the IL-50/ 83 Cicero Exit.

Robbins Airport, the first to be owned and operated by African-Americans in the United States, was located here from 1930 to 1933. It had the only flight school at the time where African-Americans could be trained as pilots, and served as a model for the Tuskegee Airmen Program during World War II. Many great African-American pilots flew into this forgotten airport. The surrounding white communities, such as Blue Island and Midlothian, did not approve of this activity, and their police sometimes arrested black pilots after they had landed in Robbins. The one-runway airport and hangar were destroyed by a tornado in 1933. School and operations were relocated by the invitation of white owners of the Harlem Airport in Chicago (it was located south of present-day Midway International Airport). From there, many of the flight school instructors entered the Tuskegee Airmen Program. One notable instructor and the man considered to be the founder of the Robbins airport was John C. Robinson, who was Supreme Commander of the Ethiopian Air Force when Italy invaded Ethiopia in 1935. The activities of these men and women have been recognized by the Smithsonian Institution's Air and Space Museum.

Education
Posen-Robbins School District 143½ serves Robbins.

Notable people 

 Jan Bradley, soul singer ("Mama Didn't Lie"); grew up in Robbins
 Bessie Coleman, co-founder of the Robbins Airport with aviators John C. Robinson (aviator) and Cornelius Coffey, an operations center for black aviation
 S. B. Fuller, businessman (founded Fuller Products Company) and publisher (New York Age and Pittsburgh Courier) 
 Thomas J. Kellar, founding mayor of Robbins
 James Loving, wide receiver for Philadelphia Eagles
 Joe Montgomery, running back with the New York Giants and Carolina Panthers; born in Robbins
 Nichelle Nichols, actress, known for playing Uhura in Star Trek; born Grace Nichols in Robbins
 Keke Palmer, actress, TV show host, singer, activist, fashion designer, known for movie Akeelah and the Bee; grew up in Robbins
 Jim Smith, wide receiver for Pittsburgh Steelers, two-time Super Bowl champion; grew up in Robbins
 Dwyane Wade, former NBA shooting guard, three-time NBA champion; grew up in Robbins

References

External links
 Village of Robbins official website

 
Villages in Illinois
Villages in Cook County, Illinois
Chicago metropolitan area
Populated places established in 1917
1917 establishments in Illinois
Majority-minority cities and towns in Cook County, Illinois
African-American cultural history